The 1910–11 season was the 12th season for FC Barcelona.

Squad

Results 

 

1. 2.

External links

References

FC Barcelona seasons
Barcelona